The tzero is a handmade electric sports car designed and built in very limited numbers by the U.S. company AC Propulsion in the early 2000s. It was the direct predecessor of the Tesla line of electric cars. The tzero was based on the Piontek Sportech kit car, which consists of a fiberglass body built over a reinforced steel space frame with double wishbone independent suspension and rack and pinion steering. AC Propulsion added the AC-150 drivetrain, a single-speed electric system with an overall gear ratio of 9:1.

Launched in January 1997, only three prototypes were built and plans for commercial production were dropped in mid-2003. The name comes from t0, the mathematical symbol for a starting point in time. Due to high production costs, AC Propulsion ceased to produce the tzero. Only three were built, and as of 2017 only 1 survived. The only remaining example is owned by the company itself.

Because the car recharges its batteries when the throttle is released slowing sharply as energy is recaptured it can be driven hard using only the accelerator pedal. Also, if the car detects a turn with more than half a g-force (5 m/s²), it eases the rear-wheel regenerative braking to prevent slides.

Original lead–acid battery powered tzero

Even with the single ratio, lead–acid models are capable of completing a quarter mile (400 m) drag race in 13.24 seconds. The car could be charged from 0 to 95% within an hour. The base price of this version was to have been US$80,000.

Lithium-ion battery conversion

Tom Gage was contacted by Martin Eberhard about the tZero car which Gage had built, and was currently converting to lithium batteries, similar to those that make up the battery packs of laptop computers. Gage stated that Eberhard had multiple "Schemes" and that he had to explain to Eberhard how unfeasible most of his concepts were. The conversion was done over six months from March through September, 2003 and gave the tzero a  range. The base price of the car was US$220,000. Elon Musk and Martin Eberhard encouraged Tom Gage and Alan Cocconi to move the lithium-ion powered prototype into production. Eberhard then borrowed the converted tzero for three months and used it as a daily driver.

JB Straubel then told Elon Musk about the newly converted, now lithium-ion powered tzero and arranged a test drive. Musk also encouraged AC Propulsion to commercialize the vehicle. Tom Gage, however, again deferred in favor of working on their electrified Scion xB called the eBox. But he put Elon Musk in contact with Martin Eberhard which led to Elon Musk's Series A funding of Tesla Motors in April, 2004 and their hiring JB Straubel.

Long Ranger genset trailer

AC Propulsion also built a portable internal combustion powered generator mounted on a trailer known as the Long Ranger that can be towed behind the car and feed power to the batteries during travel. The trailer uses a 500 cc Kawasaki engine with a 9.5 U.S. gallon (40 liter) fuel tank and achieved  in highway driving over at least . It is rated at  DC output and can maintain . The trailer incorporates a novel "backtracking" feature that automatically steers the trailer wheels allowing even novice drivers to easily back a trailer through complex maneuvers; the company published a video demonstrating the ease with which the trailer could be backed through a set of slalom cones.

Production
, only one tzero remains.  Gruber Motor Company's car was destroyed in a building fire in May 2017.

See also
 La Jamais Contente
 Keio University Eliica
 Lightning GT
 Think Global AS
 Venturi Fétish
 Wrightspeed X1
 Aptera Motors

References

External links

 Lots of Zoom, With Batteries The New York Times, September 19, 2003

Automotive technologies
Electric sports cars
Electric concept cars
Production electric cars